The women's 4 × 100 metres relay event at the 1999 Pan American Games was held on July 30.

Results

References

IAAF 1999 year top list with relay squads

Athletics at the 1999 Pan American Games
1999
1999 in women's athletics